The 1947 Arizona State Sun Devils football team was an American football team that represented Arizona State College (later renamed Arizona State University) in the Border Conference during the 1947 college football season. In its first season under head coach Ed Doherty, the team compiled a 4–7 record (3–4 against Border opponents) and outscored opponents by a total of 234 to 168.

Schedule

References

Arizona State
Arizona State Sun Devils football seasons
Arizona State Sun Devils football